The kissing prochilodus or flag-tailed prochilodus (Semaprochilodus insignis) is a species of South American freshwater fish in the family Prochilodontidae. It is native to central and western parts of the Amazon basin. It is migratory, moving in large groups into whitewater rivers to spawn, afterwards returning to blackwater and clearwater rivers, as well as flooded forests. It is important in fisheries and sometimes seen in the aquarium trade, but require a relatively large tank. It resembles the other members of the genus Semaprochilodus, where most species are silvery with orange-red fins and a striped tail. Adult S. insignis lack the dark flank spots that can be seen in adult S. taeniurus, but both species have these spots as juveniles.

References

Prochilodontidae
Taxa named by Sir William Jardine
Fish described in 1841